The Stolp-Adams SA-100 Starduster is an American single-seat sport biplane designed to be built from plans supplied by Aircraft Spruce & Specialty Co.  Though the first flight was in 1957, Stardusters continue to be built and flown.

Design and development
The SA-100 Starduster was designed by Louis A. Stolp and George M. Adams as a light sports aircraft for homebuilding from plans.  It is a single bay biplane with fabric covered, wooden framed staggered wings, each pair braced by a single, wide chord interplane strut aided by bracing wires.  A total of eight centre section struts join the upper wing to the fuselage, basically two pairs in N-form but with the forward strut doubled. The lower wing is unswept and has 1.5° of dihedral; the upper wing has 6° of sweep on its leading edge, no dihedral and a greater span.  There are ailerons on the lower wings only, but no flaps.
  
The fuselage and tail unit have a fabric covered steel tube structure, with the open cockpit positioned just behind the swept upper wing trailing edge which has a rounded cut-out for upward visibility.  There is a long and prominent faired headrest behind the cockpit, on top of the curved upper fuselage surface.  The Starduster has a conventional tail unit, with a wire braced tailplane and straight tapered, round topped fin and rudder, the latter extending to the keel between split elevators.  Both rudder and elevators are horn balanced.

It has a conventional tailwheel undercarriage. The mainwheels are mounted on V-struts hinged from the lower fuselage longeron, with rubber shock absorbers on diagonal extension struts between wheel and a short, central, under fuselage V-form mounting bracket. The main legs are often partially or completely faired and the wheels enclosed in spats.

Operational history
Starduster plans remain available more than 50 years after the first flight and homebuilding building continues. A Starduster register currently shows 27 SA-100 Stardusters and 3 SA-101 Super Stardusters built and building.  The FAA register shows 64 SA-100s and 1 SA-101, though not all are assigned and some further Stardusters appear without a type number.

Variants
SA-100 Starduster
Original version, designed for non-aerobatic flight. Although many have proven stress to +6g -4G and a Vne of 185 kn

SA-101 Stolp Super Starduster
Larger and more powerful — uses the longer wings of the CA300 Starduster Too, which have a symmetric M6 airfoil and no dihedral, together with a 180 hp (134 kW) Lycoming I0-360-A1A engine to produce a maximum speed of over 170 mph (275 km/h).

Specifications (SA-100)

See also

References

Starduster
1950s United States sport aircraft
Single-engined tractor aircraft
Biplanes
Aircraft first flown in 1957